National Stock Exchange could refer to:

National Stock Exchange of Australia
National Stock Exchange of India
National Stock Exchange (Jersey City, New Jersey) (ceased trading operations in 2014)